Karl Kustav Kalkun (9 April 1927 Tartu – 21 February 1990 Tallinn) was an Estonian actor.

Early life and acreer

Karl Kalkun was born in Tartu as one of three children to. Karl Kalkun Sr., a stage manager of the Vanemuine theatre, and Emma Helene Kalkun (née Engelbär). He was the nephew of discus and hammer thrower Gustav Kalkun. In 1946, he graduated from secondary school at Tartu Secondary School No. 1 (now, the Hugo Treffner Gymnasium). In 1956 he graduated from Tartu State University's department of law. 

From 1951 until 1958, he worked at Vanemuine theatre. From 1958 until 1965, he worked at the Estonian Drama Theatre. From 1965 until 1978, he was employed at the at Estonian Youth Theatre. From 1978 until 1990, he worked at the Estonia Theatre. Besides theatre roles he played also in several films.

Personal life and death
Kalkun first married Estelle Piirand. The couple had one son, Andres. They later divorced. His second marriage was to Mare Kiisküla, with whom he had two sons, sports journalist Kristjan Kalkun and lawyer Kaarel Kalkun. The couple were still married at the time of his death.   
 
On 21 February 1990, Kalkun was at the Eesti Televisioon (ETV) studios in Tallinn during the filming of Teemaõhtu for an interview and career and life retrospective with journalist and actress Anne Tuuling when he died of a heart attack, aged sixty-two. He was interred at Tallinn's Forest Cemetery.

Awards
 1975: Meritorious Artist of the Estonian SSR

Filmography
 1960: Perekond Männard 
 1961: Laulu sõber
 1967: Viini postmark
 1968: Hullumeelsus
 1969: Viimne reliikvia 
 1970: Tuulevaikus 
 1970: Hamlet
 1977: Karikakramäng: Tätoveering 
 1978: Siin me oleme! 
 1983: Teatridirektor
 1986: Õnnelind flamingo 
 1987: Eine murul (animated film; voice)
 1987: Näkimadalad I jagu
 1987: Näkimadalad II jagu 	
 1988: Näkimadalad IV jagu

References

1927 births
1990 deaths
Estonian male stage actors
Estonian male film actors
Estonian male television actors
Estonian male radio actors
20th-century Estonian male actors
Hugo Treffner Gymnasium alumni
University of Tartu alumni
Male actors from Tartu
Burials at Metsakalmistu